The Canonbie Priory was a community of Augustinian canons based at Canonbie in Dumfriesshire, Scotland. It was founded from Jedburgh Abbey after a grant by a minor landlord, Turgis de Rosdale, confirmed by of King William somewhere between 1165 and 1170. The house was small and is badly recorded. It was turned into a secular lordship in 1606, as part of Jedburgh Abbey,  for Alexander, Lord Home.

References
 Cowan, Ian B. & Easson, David E., Medieval Religious Houses: Scotland With an Appendix on the Houses in the Isle of Man, Second Edition, (London, 1976), p. 90
 Watt, D.E.R. & Shead, N.F. (eds.), The Heads of Religious Houses in Scotland from the 12th to the 16th Centuries, The Scottish Records Society, New Series, Volume 24, (Edinburgh, 2001), pp. 28–9

See also
 Prior of Canonbie

Augustinian monasteries in Scotland
Buildings and structures in Dumfries and Galloway
History of Dumfriesshire
Christian monasteries established in the 12th century
12th century in Scotland
Former Christian monasteries in Scotland